Patchakán is a town in Corozal District, in northern Belize.  According to the 2000 census, it had a population of 1,142 people mainly of the Yucatec Maya ethnicity. The name Patchacan means "behind the shavanna" in Yucatec Maya .

References

Populated places in Corozal District
Corozal North